Afrolimnophila is a genus of crane flies in the family Limoniidae.

Species
A. abludens (Savchenko, 1971)
A. abyssinica (Alexander, 1920)
A. aino (Alexander, 1929)
A. amabilis (Alexander, 1950)
A. antimena (Alexander, 1956)
A. antimenoides (Alexander, 1956)
A. apicifusca (Alexander, 1964)
A. asura (Alexander, 1956) - (Uncertain placement in Afrolimnophila)
A. basispina (Savchenko, 1971)
A. bicoloripes (Alexander, 1964)
A. dichroica (Alexander, 1956)
A. dicranophragmoides (Alexander, 1924)
A. euglena (Alexander, 1971)
A. fenestrella (Alexander, 1940)
A. ghesquierei (Alexander, 1970)
A. guttularis (Edwards, 1926)
A. hartwigi (Alexander, 1974)
A. irrorata (Johnson, 1909)
A. joana (Alexander, 1974)
A. melampodia (Alexander, 1956)
A. minima (Savchenko, 1971)
A. murudensis (Edwards, 1926)
A. namwambae (Alexander, 1956)
A. pakkana (Edwards, 1933)
A. pendleburyi (Edwards, 1928)
A. perdelecta (Alexander, 1964)
A. petulans (Alexander, 1932)
A. piceipes (Alexander, 1968)
A. pterosticta (Alexander, 1964)
A. pusan (Alexander, 1964)
A. raoana (Alexander, 1942)
A. scabristyla (Alexander, 1964)
A. stenacris (Alexander, 1968)
A. unijuga (Alexander, 1920)
A. urundiana (Alexander, 1955)
A. vansomereni (Alexander, 1956)

References

Limoniidae
Tipuloidea genera